Begonia serotina is a species of plant in the family Begoniaceae. It is endemic to Ecuador.  Its natural habitat is subtropical or tropical dry forests. It is threatened by habitat loss.

References

serotina
Endemic flora of Ecuador
Endangered plants
Taxonomy articles created by Polbot